A Delicate Balance is a 1973 American-Canadian-British drama film directed by Tony Richardson and starring Katharine Hepburn, Paul Scofield, Lee Remick, Kate Reid, Joseph Cotten, and Betsy Blair. The screenplay by Edward Albee is based on his 1966 Pulitzer Prize-winning play of the same name.

The film was the second in a series produced by Ely Landau for his American Film Theatre, a subscription-based program of screen adaptations of notable stage plays shown in five hundred theaters in four hundred cities.

Plot
The film spans three days in the life of Agnes and Tobias, an upper middle class couple who share their comfortable suburban Connecticut home with Agnes' acerbic alcoholic sister Claire. It is matriarch Agnes who helps the trio maintain a delicate balance in their lives, held together by habit, shared memories, and considerable consumption of dry martinis.

The seemingly peaceful facade of their existence is shattered with the arrival of longtime friends Harry and Edna who, suddenly overcome by a nameless terror, fled their home in search of a safe haven. The couple is followed by Agnes and Tobias' bitter, 36-year-old daughter Julia, who has returned to the family nest following the collapse of her fourth marriage.
Their presence leads to a period of self-examination, during which all six are forced to explore their psyches and confront the demons hidden there.

Cast

Critical reception
Roger Ebert of the Chicago Sun-Times called the film "a fine, tough, lacerating production", and added, "Richardson's cast could hardly be better".

TV Guide rated the film two out of four stars, calling it "unfortunately stiff, dull, and extremely stagy".

Awards and nominations
Kate Reid was nominated for the Golden Globe Award for Best Supporting Actress – Motion Picture.

See also
 List of American films of 1973

References

External links

1973 films
1973 drama films
American drama films
English-language Canadian films
Canadian drama films
British drama films
Films about dysfunctional families
British films based on plays
American films based on plays
Films directed by Tony Richardson
Films produced by Ely Landau
Films set in Connecticut
American independent films
Canadian independent films
British independent films
1973 independent films
1970s English-language films
1970s American films
1970s Canadian films
1970s British films